Rasmussen's encephalitis is a rare inflammatory neurological disease, characterized by frequent and severe seizures, loss of motor skills and speech, hemiparesis (weakness on one side of the body), encephalitis (inflammation of the brain), and dementia. The illness affects a single cerebral hemisphere and generally occurs in children under the age of 15.

Signs and symptoms
The condition mostly affects children, with an average age of 6 years. However, one in ten people with the condition develops it in adulthood.

There are two main stages, sometimes preceded by a 'prodromal stage' of a few months. In the acute stage, lasting four to eight months, the inflammation is active and the symptoms become progressively worse. These include weakness of one side of the body (hemiparesis), loss of vision for one side of the visual field (hemianopia), and cognitive difficulties (affecting learning, memory or language, for example). Epileptic seizures are also a major part of the illness, although these are often partial. Focal motor seizures or epilepsia partialis continua are particularly common, and may be very difficult to control with drugs.

In the chronic or residual stage, the inflammation is no longer active, but the affected individual is left with some or all of the symptoms because of the damage that the inflammation has caused. In the long term, most patients are left with some epilepsy, paralysis and cognitive problems, but the severity varies considerably.

Pathophysiology 
In Rasmussen's encephalitis, there is chronic inflammation of the brain, with infiltration of T lymphocytes into the brain tissue. In most cases, this affects only one cerebral hemisphere, either the left or the right. This inflammation causes permanent damage to the cells of the brain, leading to atrophy of the hemisphere; the epilepsy that this causes may itself contribute to the brain damage. The epilepsy might derive from a disturbed GABA release, the main inhibitory neurotransmitter of the mammalian brain.

The cause of the inflammation is not known: infection by a virus has been suggested, but the evidence for this is inconclusive. In the 1990s it was suggested that auto-antibodies against the glutamate receptor GluR3 were important in causing the disease, but this is no longer thought to be the case. However, more recent studies report the presence of autoantibodies against the NMDA-type glutamate receptor subunit GluRepsilon2 (anti-NR2A antibodies) in a subset of patients with Rasmussen's encephalitis. There has also been some evidence that patients with RE express auto-antibodies against alpha 7 subunit of the nicotinic acetylcholine receptor. By sequencing T cell receptors from various compartments it could be shown that RE patients present with peripheral CD8+ T-cell expansion which in some cases have been proven for years after disease onset.

Rasmussen's encephalitis has been recorded with a neurovisceral porphyria, and acute intermittent porphyria.

Diagnosis

The diagnosis may be made on the clinical features alone, along with tests to rule out other possible causes. An EEG will usually show the electrical features of epilepsy and slowing of brain activity in the affected hemisphere, and MRI brain scans will show gradual shrinkage of the affected hemisphere with signs of inflammation or scarring.

Brain biopsy can provide very strong confirmation of the diagnosis, but this is not always necessary.

Treatment
During the acute stage, treatment is aimed at reducing the inflammation. As in other inflammatory diseases, steroids may be used first of all, either as a short course of high-dose treatment, or in a lower dose for long-term treatment. Intravenous immunoglobulin is also effective both in the short term and in the long term, particularly in adults where it has been proposed as first-line treatment. Other similar treatments include plasmapheresis and tacrolimus, though there is less evidence for these. None of these treatments can prevent permanent disability from developing.

During the residual stage of the illness when there is no longer active inflammation, treatment is aimed at improving the remaining symptoms. Standard anti-epileptic drugs are usually ineffective in controlling seizures, and it may be necessary to surgically remove or disconnect the affected cerebral hemisphere, in an operation called hemispherectomy or via a corpus callosotomy. This usually results in further weakness, hemianopsia and cognitive problems, but the other side of the brain may be able to take over some of the function, particularly in young children. The operation may not be advisable if the left hemisphere is affected, since this hemisphere contains most of the parts of the brain that control language. However, hemispherectomy is often very effective in reducing seizures.

History
It is named for the neurosurgeon  (1910–2002), who succeeded Wilder Penfield as head of the Montreal Neurological Institute, and served as Neurosurgeon-in-Chief at the Royal Victoria Hospital.

Society
The Hemispherectomy Foundation was formed in 2008 to assist families with children who have Rasmussen's encephalitis and other conditions that require hemispherectomy.

The RE Children's Project was founded in 2010 to increase awareness of Rasmussen's encephalitis. Its primary purpose is to support scientific research directed toward finding a cure for this disease.

References

External links 

  (Note: parts of this entry were copied from this Public Domain source.)

Encephalitis
Disorders causing seizures
Epilepsy types